Íþróttabandalag Akraness (ÍA) competed in Úrvalsdeild in the 2015 season after finishing in 2nd place in 1. deild karla in 2014.

The 2015 season was ÍA's 63rd season in the top-flight of Icelandic football.

Gunnlaugur Jónsson head coached the team for the second season running. He was assisted by Jón Þór Hauksson.

ÍA finished the season in 7th place in the league. Garðar Gunnlaugsson took home the bronze shoe with 9 goals in 17 games.

First team

Transfers and loans

Transfers in

Transfers out

Loans in

Loans out

Pre-season

Fótbolti.net Cup
ÍA took part in the 2015 Fótbolti.net Cup, a pre-season tournament for clubs outside of Reykjavík. The team played in Group 1 along with Breiðablik, FH and Þróttur R. ÍA finished third in the group and played ÍBV in the 5th place final. The game ended 2–2 and went to penalties where ÍA won 4–1.

Lengjubikarinn
ÍA were drawn in group 3 in the Icelandic league cup, Lengjubikarinn, along with Valur, Stjarnan, Keflavík, Grindavík, Haukar, Fjarðabyggð and Þór. ÍA won their first four games against Haukar, Stjarnan, Þór, and Grindavík but eventually lost in the fifth round 3–1 to Valur. On 21 March ÍA secured their place in the quarter-finals by defeating Keflavík 2–1. ÍA secured the 1st place in the group on 29 March by defeating Fjarðabyggð 4–3, with a hat trick from Arsenij Buinickij.

ÍA defeated Fjölnir in the quarter finals 5–1, with Arsenij Buinickij scoring his second hat trick of the competition. Garðar scored the other two goals while former ÍA player Ragnar Leósson scored Fjölnir's only goal.

On 19 April ÍA lost in the semi finals to KA after a penalty shootout. The game had ended 1–1 after 90 min with Jón Vilhelm scoring ÍA's only goal.

Úrvalsdeild

League table

Matches

Summary of results

Points breakdown
 Points at home: 16
 Points away from home: 13
 6 Points: Leiknir R, Keflavík, ÍBV
 4 Points: 
 3 Points: Valur
 2 Points: Víkingur R, KR, Fylkir
 1 Points: Stjarnan, Fjölnir
 0 Points: FH, Breiðablik

Borgunarbikarinn
ÍA came into the Icelandic cup, Borgunarbikarinn, in the 32nd finals and were drawn against Fjölnir. ÍA lost the game 0–3.

Squad statistics

Goalscorers
Includes all competitive matches.

Appearances
Includes all competitive matches. Numbers in parentheses are sub-appearances.

Disciplinary record
Includes all competitive matches.

References

2015 in Icelandic football
Íþróttabandalag Akraness
Íþróttabandalag Akraness seasons